The EH postcode area, also known as the Edinburgh postcode area, is a group of 54 postcode districts for post towns: Armadale, Balerno, Bathgate, Bo'ness, Bonnyrigg, Broxburn, Currie, Dalkeith, Dunbar, East Linton, Edinburgh, Gorebridge, Gullane, Haddington, Heriot, Humbie, Innerleithen, Juniper Green, Kirkliston, Kirknewton, Lasswade, Linlithgow, Livingston, Loanhead, Longniddry, Musselburgh, Newbridge, North Berwick, Pathhead, Peebles, Penicuik, Prestonpans, Rosewell, Roslin, South Queensferry, Tranent, Walkerburn, West Calder and West Linton in Scotland.



Coverage 
The approximate coverage of the postcode districts:

Edinburgh's EH1 to EH17 & EH28 to EH30 

|-
! EH1
| EDINBURGH
| Mostly consists of Edinburgh's Old Town. Also hosts the old GPO building (at EH1 1AA) and the areas immediately to the north of this are also included, that is St James Quarter and the areas down Leith Street and Broughton Street.
| 
|-
! EH2
| EDINBURGH
| The New Town and central commercial area of Edinburgh which includes Princes Street.
| 
|-
! EH3
| EDINBURGH
| An odd shaped area surrounding EH1 and EH2 to the north, west and south. It can be divided into three distinct areas:

The New Town area, north of Queen Street and northwards to Stockbridge.
The West End, including some of Edinburgh's financial district
The Tollcross and Fountainbridge areas.
| 
|-
! EH4
| EDINBURGH
| Radiates from the older and more central areas out to the suburban areas added to them, as the city grew outwards during the 20th century.  EH4, then, branches out from Dean Village and Comely Bank along a corridor centred on the A90 as far as Barnton and Cramond.  Central to this area is the Sainsbury's in Craigleith Retail Park adjacent to the A90.
| 
|-
! EH5
| EDINBURGH
| Based on a village formerly separate from the city; in this case, Granton on the Firth of Forth.  EH5 extends inwards from the coast to Ferry Road.
| 
|-
! EH6
| EDINBURGH
| Covers Leith, as well as Newhaven bordering it on the west.
| 
|-
! EH7
| EDINBURGH
| The inner city area between central Edinburgh and Leith, and radiates out to Restalrig and Craigentinny.
| 
|-
! EH8
| EDINBURGH
| The inner city Southside, Newington and Canongate areas, in the west of the postcode area.  It spreads eastwards around Holyrood Park to take in areas like Abbeyhill and Mountcastle; being in east Edinburgh these areas have no obvious connection with the Southside.  However the postcode effectively takes in the area surrounding Holyrood Park.
| 
|-
! EH9
| EDINBURGH
| The inner city, Marchmont and Grange, Blackford and around Minto Street, including Causewayside.
| 
|-
! EH10
| EDINBURGH
| A corridor along the A702 from Bruntsfield, through Morningside as far as Fairmilehead.
| City of Edinburgh, Midlothian
|-
! EH11
| EDINBURGH
| A corridor (rather thin in shape) along the A71 from Haymarket Station, through Gorgie and Stenhouse to Sighthill and the Calders.
| 
|-
! EH12
| EDINBURGH
| A corridor along the A8 from Haymarket through Murrayfield and Corstorphine as far as the Gyle.
| 
|-
! EH13
| EDINBURGH
| Based on the previously separate village of Colinton, and including Oxgangs.
| 
|-
! EH14
| BALERNO, CURRIE, EDINBURGH, JUNIPER GREEN
| A corridor in south-west Edinburgh starting at Slateford, through Longstone, Wester Hailes, Juniper Green, Currie and on to Balerno.
| 
|-
! EH15
| EDINBURGH
| Based on Portobello and Duddingston, formerly separate settlements to Edinburgh.
| 
|-
! EH16
| EDINBURGH
| Based on the formerly separate village of Liberton.  It extends north and north-east to Cameron Toll, Craigmillar and Niddrie.
| 
|-
! EH17
| EDINBURGH
| Based on the formerly separate village of Gilmerton, taking in Moredun and extending westwards as far as Mortonhall.
|
|-
! EH28
| NEWBRIDGE
| Newbridge, Ratho
| City of Edinburgh Council
|-
! EH29
| KIRKLISTON
| Kirkliston
| City of Edinburgh Council
|-
! EH30
| SOUTH QUEENSFERRY
| South Queensferry
| City of Edinburgh Council| 
|-
! EH77
| EDINBURGH
| Special postcode used by Census 2021
|-
! EH91
| EDINBURGH
| Special postcode used by Jobcentre Plus
|-
! EH95
| EDINBURGH
| Special postcode used by Scottish Gas.
|-
! EH99
| EDINBURGH
| Special postcode used by the Scottish Parliament.
| 
|}

Outside Edinburgh 

|-
! EH18
| LASSWADE
| Lasswade, extending up the valley of the River North Esk to Polton
| Midlothian Council
|-
! EH19
| BONNYRIGG
| Bonnyrigg
| Midlothian Council
|-
! EH20
| LOANHEAD
| Loanhead
| Midlothian Council
|-
! EH21
| MUSSELBURGH
| Musselburgh, Wallyford, Whitecraig, Newcraighall
| East Lothian Council, City of Edinburgh Council
|-
! EH22
| DALKEITH
| Dalkeith, Danderhall, Mayfield, Newtongrange, Shawfair
| Midlothian Council
|-
! EH23
| GOREBRIDGE
| Gorebridge
| Midlothian Council
|-
! EH24
| ROSEWELL
| Rosewell
| Midlothian Council
|-
! EH25
| ROSLIN
| Roslin, Bilston
| Midlothian Council
|-
! EH26
| PENICUIK
| Penicuik
| Midlothian Council
|-
! EH27
| KIRKNEWTON
| Kirknewton
| West Lothian Council
|-
! EH31
| GULLANE
| Gullane
| East Lothian Council
|-
! EH32
| LONGNIDDRY, PRESTONPANS
| Prestonpans, Cockenzie, Port Seton
| East Lothian Council
|-
! EH33
| TRANENT
| Tranent
| East Lothian Council
|-
! EH34
| TRANENT
| Pencaitland
| East Lothian Council
|-
! EH35
| TRANENT
| Ormiston
| East Lothian Council
|-
! EH36
| HUMBIE
| Humbie
| East Lothian Council
|-
! EH37
| PATHHEAD
| Pathhead
| Midlothian Council
|-
! EH38
| HERIOT
| North Middleton, Heriot
| Midlothian Council, Scottish Borders Council
|-
! EH39
| NORTH BERWICK
| North Berwick
| East Lothian Council
|-
! EH40
| EAST LINTON
| East Linton
| East Lothian Council
|-
! EH41
| HADDINGTON
| Haddington
| East Lothian Council
|-
! EH42
| DUNBAR
| Dunbar, Broxburn, East Lothian
| East Lothian Council
|-
! EH43
| WALKERBURN
| Walkerburn
| Scottish Borders Council
|-
! EH44
| INNERLEITHEN
| Innerleithen
| Scottish Borders Council
|-
! EH45
| PEEBLES
| Peebles
| Scottish Borders Council
|-
! EH46
| WEST LINTON
| West Linton
| Scottish Borders Council
|-
! EH47
| BATHGATE
| Whitburn, Bathgate, Fauldhouse, Stoneyburn
| West Lothian Council
|-
! EH48
| BATHGATE
| Armadale, Bathgate
| West Lothian Council
|-
! EH49
| LINLITHGOW
| Linlithgow
| West Lothian Council
|-
! EH51
| BO'NESS
| Bo'ness
| Falkirk Council
|-
! EH52
| BROXBURN
| Broxburn, West Lothian, including Winchburgh
| West Lothian Council
|-
! EH53
| LIVINGSTON
| Mid Calder, East Calder, Pumpherston
| West Lothian Council
|-
! EH54
| LIVINGSTON
| Livingston
| West Lothian Council
|-
! EH55
| WEST CALDER
| West Calder
| West Lothian Council, South Lanarkshire Council
|}

Map

See also
Postcode Address File
List of postcode areas in the United Kingdom

References

External links
Royal Mail's Postcode Address File
A quick introduction to Royal Mail's Postcode Address File (PAF)

Geography of Edinburgh
Postcode areas covering Scotland